The first cabinet of Manolache Costache Epureanu was the government of Romania from 20 April 1870 to 14 December 1870.

Ministers
The ministers of the cabinet were as follows:

President of the Council of Ministers:
Manolache Costache Epureanu  (20 April - 14 December 1870)
Minister of the Interior: 
Manolache Costache Epureanu  (20 April - 14 December 1870)
Minister of Foreign Affairs: 
Petre P. Carp (20 April - 14 December 1870)
Minister of Finance:
Constantin Grădișteanu (20 April - 14 December 1870)
Minister of Justice:
Alexandru N. Lahovari (20 April - 14 December 1870)
Minister of War:
Col. George Manu (20 April - 14 December 1870)
Minister of Religious Affairs and Public Instruction:
Vasile Pogor (20 April - 23 May 1870)
(interim) Petre P. Carp (23 May - 14 December 1870)
Minister of Public Works:
George Gr. Cantacuzino (20 April - 14 December 1870)

References

Cabinets of Romania
Cabinets established in 1870
Cabinets disestablished in 1870
1870 establishments in Romania
1870 disestablishments in Romania